WNDD (92.5 FM, "Wind FM") is a commercial radio station in Alachua, Florida, broadcasting to the Gainesville/Ocala, Florida market on 92.5 FM. The same programming is simulcast on stations WYND-FM (Silver Springs) and WNDN (Chiefland).

External links
Official Website

NDD
Classic rock radio stations in the United States
Radio stations established in 1996
1996 establishments in Florida